Vanha Munkkiniemi (Finnish), Gamla Munksnäs (Swedish), both of them meaning ′Old Munkkiniemi′, is a neighborhood that contains the original part of Munkkiniemi district in Helsinki, Finland.

Munkkiniemi